The West Zone cricket team is a first-class cricket team that represents western India in the Duleep Trophy and Deodhar Trophy. It is a composite team of players from five first-class Indian teams from western India competing in the Ranji Trophy: Baroda, Gujarat, Maharashtra, Mumbai and Saurashtra. West Zone has the best track record of all the zones in the Duleep Trophy, as they have won the Trophy 17 times, similar to North Zone. This included four consecutive titles from 1961-62 through to the 1964-65 season, although the third of these were shared with South Zone. Playing against South Zone at the Rajiv Gandhi Stadium in the 2009-10 Duleep Trophy final, West Zone set a new first-class record for the highest fourth innings total to win a match, scoring 541-7.

Current squad

Famous players from West Zone

Ajit Agarkar
Sairaj Bahutule
Sunil Gavaskar
Vijay Hazare
Wasim Jaffer
Vinod Kambli
Saurabh Chauhan
Vinoo Mankad
Vijay Merchant
Nayan Mongia
Parthiv Patel
Irfan Pathan
Yusuf Pathan
Rohit Sharma
Sachin Tendulkar
Zaheer Khan
Dilip Vengsarkar
Ravi Shastri
Ajinkya Rahane
Kedar Jadhav
Hardik Pandya
Krunal Pandya
Jasprit Bumrah

References

External links
 West Zone at CricketArchive

Indian first-class cricket teams